Warwick Nesbit Snedden (10 July 1920 – 25 December 1990) was a New Zealand cricketer who played two matches for Auckland in the 1946–47 season. A right-handed batsman and right-arm medium bowler, Snedden made 92 runs from his two matches at 30.66, largely from one knock of 75. His father, Nessie Snedden and brother Colin Snedden both played first-class cricket, while his son Martin Snedden played 25 Tests and 93 One Day Internationals for New Zealand.

See also
 List of Auckland representative cricketers

References

External links
 

1920 births
1990 deaths
Cricketers from Auckland
New Zealand cricketers
Auckland cricketers
Warwick